Flavianus—the adjectival form of the name Flavius in Latin—may refer to:

 M. Pompeius Silvanus Staberius Flavianus, a 1st-century Roman consul
 L. Septimius Flavianus Flavillianus, a 3rd-century Roman athlete
 Faustus Flavianus, fully Marcus Cocceius Anicius Faustus Flavianus, a 3rd-century Roman consul
 Flavianus, a 4th-century prefect of Roman Egypt
 Flavianus the Elder, fully Virius Nicomachus Flavianus, a 4th-century Roman consul and prefect of Italy
 Flavianus the Younger, also known as Nicomachus Flavianus, son of the Italian prefect
 St Flavianus of Avellino ( 311), a priest from Antioch martyred with St Florentinus
 St Flavianus of Constantinople, referring to either
 St Flavianus I of Constantinople  ( 449), patriarch
 St Flavianus II of Constantinople, better known as Fravitta ( 490), patriarch
 Flavianus I of Antioch, a 4th-century archbishop
 Flavianus II of Antioch, a late 5th- and early 6th-century archbishop
 Flavianus, a 5th-century bishop of Adramyttium
 Flavianus, a 6th-century bishop of Cotenna
 St Flavianus Michael Malke (1858–1915), Syrian Catholic eparch of Cizre martyred during a Turkish massacre of Christians

See also
 Flavian, the common anglicization of these names
 349, known to the Romans as the "Year of Flavianus without colleague" after Flavianus the Elder
 Epitome of the Caesars, one of the few sources preserving passages of Flavianus the Elder's Annals